Derek Coventry Patmore (1908, London1972) was a British writer.  He was the great grandson of the poet Coventry Patmore.

Patmore was educated at Uppingham School. He worked as a war correspondent in the Balkans and the Middle East, writing for the News Chronicle and the Daily Mail.

In 1940, having met Patmore in Bucharest, the Romanian writer Mihail Sebastian wrote in his diary that Camil Petrescu told him Patmore was a pederast.

Works
 Selected Poems of Coventry Patmore, London: Chatto and Windus, 1931.
 Portrait of My Family, London: Cassell, 1935.
 I Decorate My Home, London: Putnam, 1936.
 Decoration for the Small Home, London: Putnam, 1938.
 Invitation to Roumania, London: Macmillan, 1939.
 French for Love, London, 1940.
 Balkan Correspondent, New York: Harper, 1941.
 Images of Greece, London: Country Life, 1944.
 Colour Schemes and Modern Furnishing, London: The Studio, 1945.
 Life and Times of Coventry Patmore, Oxford University Press, 1949.
 Italian Pageant, London: Evans Bros, 1949.
 A Traveller in Venice, London: Methuen, 1951.
 A Decorator's Notebook, London: Falcon Press, 1952.
 Dark Places of the Heart: A Novel, London: Falcon Press, 1953.
 Private History: An Autobiography, 1960.
 Canada, London: Studio Vista, 1967.
 D. H. Lawrence and the Dominant Male, London: Covent Garden Press, 1970.
 Homage to Marcel Proust, London: Covent Garden Press, 1971.

See also
Bruscello

References

 Mitchell, Owens, "Room to Improve", The New York Times, January 26, 2006

External links 

 Stuart A. Rose Manuscript, Archives, and Rare Book Library, Emory University: Derek Patmore papers, 1928-1968

1908 births
English writers
1972 deaths